Eleanor Josephine Medill "Cissy" Patterson, Countess Gizycki (November 7, 1881 – July 24, 1948) was an American journalist and newspaper editor, publisher and owner.  Patterson was one of the first women to head a major daily newspaper, the Washington Times-Herald in Washington, D.C.

Early life
Elinor Josephine Patterson was born in Chicago, Illinois, on November 7, 1881, to the daughter of Robert and Elinor "Nellie" ( Medill) Patterson.  She would change the spelling of her first name to "Eleanor" as an adult, but would always be known as "Cissy," the name her brother gave her in childhood. Her grandfather, Joseph Medill, was Mayor of Chicago and owned the Chicago Tribune, which later passed into the hands of her first cousin Colonel Robert R. McCormick, Joseph Medill's grandson.  Her older brother, Joseph Medill Patterson, was the founder of the New York Daily News.

Education and marriage
She was educated at Miss Porter's School in Farmington, Connecticut.  When her uncle Robert S. McCormick was named ambassador to Austria-Hungary, she accompanied him and his wife, Cissy's maternal aunt Kate, to Vienna.  There she met Count Josef Gizycki and fell in love with him, a romance not interrupted even by her return to America, where she lived in Washington, D.C.  In Washington, she was a leading light in society, where the press labeled Alice Roosevelt (daughter of Theodore), Marguerite Cassini (daughter of the Russian ambassador), and Cissy the "Three Graces."  Count Gizycki came to America and they were married in Washington on April 14, 1904 despite her family's objections.

A daughter was born to them September 3, 1905, and was named Felicia Leonora (1905–1999).  Cissy went with the Count to his home, a huge feudal manor in Russian Poland. Their family life did not go well. They separated and then rejoined several times, but eventually Cissy set herself on leaving. She took their child, hiding her in a house near London, but the Count pursued her and kidnapped the little Countess, hiding her in an Austrian convent.  Cissy filed for divorce, which took thirteen years to obtain.

Business dealings and social life
After her experience abroad, she moved to Lake Forest, Illinois, a Chicago suburb, but she returned to Washington in 1913.  In 1920, her brother Joseph finally succumbed to his sister's entreaties and allowed her to write for his New York Daily News, founded the previous year.  She also worked for William Randolph Hearst.  She published two novels, romans à clef, Glass Houses (1926) and Fall Flight (1928), part of her feud with former friend Alice Roosevelt Longworth. In 1925, Eleanor married Elmer Schlesinger, a New York lawyer. He died four years later and in 1930, Mrs. Schlesinger legally changed her name to Mrs. Eleanor Medill Patterson.

Patterson tried to buy Hearst's two Washington papers, the morning Washington Herald and the evening Washington Times.  However, Hearst hated to sell anything, even when he needed the money.  Although he had never made money from his Washington papers, he refused to give up the prestige of owning papers in the capital. However, at the urging of his editor Arthur Brisbane, Hearst agreed to make Patterson the papers' editor.  She began work on August 1, 1930.  Patterson was a hands-on editor who insisted on the best of everything—writing, layout, typography, images, and comics.  She encouraged society reporting and the women's page and hired many women as reporters including Adela Rogers St. Johns and Martha Blair.  In 1936, she was invited to join the American Society of Newspaper Editors.  Patterson shifted the papers' editorial stance sharply to the right.

In April 1931, Patterson purchased Mount Airy, a mansion built by Charles Calvert, 3rd Baron Baltimore, in the 1600s. Located on extensive grounds near Rosaryville, Maryland, since about 1910 the mansion's owners had operated it as Dower House, an exclusive restaurant, but it suffered a severe fire in February 1931. Patterson not only meticulously restored the mansion, but improved the stables, added a guest house, and built a greenhouse for growing orchids.

In 1937, Hearst's finances had gotten worse and he agreed to lease the Herald and the Times to Patterson with an option to buy.  Eugene Meyer, the man who had outbid Hearst and Patterson for The Washington Post in 1933, tried to buy the Herald out from under Patterson, but failed.  Instead, she bought both papers from Hearst on January 28, 1939, and merged them as the Times-Herald.

Along with her brother at the New York Daily News and her cousin at the Chicago Tribune, Patterson was an unyielding conservative.  She was an ardent isolationist and opponent of the administration of Franklin D. Roosevelt.  In 1942, after the Battle of Midway, the Times-Herald ran a Tribune story that revealed American intelligence was reading the Japanese naval code.  Roosevelt, furious, had the Tribune and the Times-Herald indicted for espionage but backed down because of the publicity, charges he was persecuting his enemies, and the likelihood of an acquittal (since the Navy's own censors had twice cleared the story before it was published).

During World War II, she and her brother were accused of being Nazi sympathizers.  Representative Elmer Holland of Pennsylvania said on the floor of the United States House of Representatives that the Pattersons "would welcome the victory of Hitler."

Family difficulties
She feuded with her daughter, who publicly "divorced" her in 1945, and with her former son-in-law, Drew Pearson, by whom she had a granddaughter, Ellen Cameron Pearson Arnold (1926–2010).  An alcoholic for most of her adult life, she died of a heart attack at age 66 at Mount Airy. She left the paper to seven of her editors who within the year sold it to her cousin Colonel McCormick.  He held onto the paper for five years, and although for several years he seemed close to returning it to profitability, it eventually proved too great a financial drain.  After quietly sounding out several other publishers, McCormick opted to sell the paper to the rival Post, which promptly closed it.

As Countess Gizycki, Patterson was a frequent visitor to her ranch in Jackson Hole, Wyoming, in the 1920s where Donald Hough records an unexpected aspect of her personality: the ability to speak effectively to horses in language worthy of a native cowboy. The Flat Creek Ranch is now on the National Register of Historic Places.

Family tree

References
Notes

Citations

Bibliography

Further reading

 Olmsted, Kathryn S. The Newspaper Axis: Six Press Barons Who Enabled Hitler (Yale UP, 2022)online also online review

1880s births
1948 deaths
20th-century American novelists
American newspaper editors
20th-century American newspaper publishers (people)
American women novelists
Burials at Graceland Cemetery (Chicago)
Medill-Patterson family
Miss Porter's School alumni
Writers from Chicago
Journalists from Washington, D.C.
Old Right (United States)
Women newspaper editors
20th-century American women writers
Novelists from Illinois
American women non-fiction writers
20th-century American non-fiction writers